Fulvoclysia dictyodana is a species of moth of the family Tortricidae. It is found in Romania, Slovakia, Turkey and the Caucasus.

References

Moths described in 1880
Cochylini